Electric Picnic is an annual arts-and-music festival which has been staged since 2004 at Stradbally Hall in Stradbally, County Laois, Ireland. It is organised by Pod Concerts and Festival Republic, who purchased the majority shareholding in 2009. It was voted Best Medium-Sized European Festival at the 2010 European Festival Awards, and has been voted Best Big Festival at each of the last four Irish Festival Awards since they began in 2007.

The Picnic has been described as "Ireland's version of Glastonbury" and "a great inspiration to Latitude" by one of its business partners, Laois. US magazine Billboard calling it as "a magnificent rock n roll circus, a textbook example of everything a festival should be" and Rolling Stone describing it as "one of the best festivals we've ever been to". The 2008 event was described by The Irish Times as "the best Electric Picnic yet".

Electric Picnic differs from other festivals in Ireland in that the music choice is more eclectic than the other mainstream events (its history includes international acts such as Kraftwerk, Röyksopp, Nick Cave, Sonic Youth, New Order, Björk, Arcade Fire, Beastie Boys, The Stooges, The Chemical Brothers, Gary Numan, The Flaming Lips, Sigur Rós and Sex Pistols), and there is more emphasis on quality festival services (such as food and sleeping arrangements) and a generally more positive and relaxed atmosphere. There is also an emphasis on eco-friendly initiatives.

Electric Picnic began as a one-day event in 2004, before growing to a weekend-long festival within a year. The festival incorporates attractions such as the 24-hour cinema tent, the Body and Soul arena (offering an ambient lounge with beanbags, massages and tarot card readings) and the Comedy Tent (curated by Gerry Mallon) and a silent disco. In 2008, Amnesty International attended the festival to celebrate the 60th anniversary of the Universal Declaration of Human Rights, whilst renowned American Burning Man artist, David Best constructed a Temple of Truth on site. Electric Picnic has been described as an "enormously successful, award-winning, established brand" which "attempts to bring to life a microcosmic cultural experience where music is just the tip of the iceberg".

2004 festival

The 2004 festival was a one-day event, which was headlined by 2 Many DJs. Other acts included Groove Armada, Arrested Development, Jurassic5, Grand Master Flash, Super Furry Animals, Plump DJ's, David Kitt, Soulwax and Mylo. Despite the fact that there was no organised camping, a number of groups camped in the field designated as the car park overnight and stayed up talking and exploring the (then pristine and nettle-free) woods. Thus, the relaxed and friendly vibe of the earlier Electric Picnic festivals was established.

2005 festival

The 2005 festival took place on Saturday 3 September and Sunday 4 September. It is best remembered for Arcade Fire's performance which came before their subsequent mainstream success. Headlining acts included Nick Cave and the Bad Seeds, Kraftwerk, The Flaming Lips, Röyksopp, Mercury Rev and The Human League.

The premiere of "Electric Picnic: The Documentary"  took place at the Irish Film Institute on Tuesday 4 July 2006 at 19:00. The critically acclaimed documentary directed by Nick Ryan, was filmed by a small camera crew who recorded the events of Electric Picnic 2005. Narrated by musician Nick Seymour and economist David McWilliams, the documentary includes footage from Kraftwerk's first recorded live performance in twelve years plus interviews with the performing bands and comedians, with a few festival-goers and with the locals of Stradbally Village, who claimed: "We get more trouble at the Vintage Steam Rally".

 Kraftwerk
 Fatboy Slim
 The Flaming Lips
 Nick Cave and the Bad Seeds
 Röyksopp
 Mercury Rev
 Arcade Fire
 Soulwax / 2 Many DJs
 Damien Dempsey
 Lemon Jelly
 Laurent Garnier
 Dublin Gospel Choir
 The Human League
 LCD Soundsystem
 Audio Bullys
 Doves
 Vitalic
 JJ72
 The Rakes
 Hot Chip
 Boss Volenti
 James Blunt
 Be Your Own Pet
 Ben Watt
 Channel One
 Goldfrapp
 The Subways
 The Chalets
 Clor
 The Unabombers
 Mr Scruff
 De La Soul
 Stereo MCs
 DJ Format
 Mixmaster Mike
 Matthew Herbert Big Band
 The Kills
 Toots & the Maytals
 The Herbaliser

2006 festival

In 2006 the festival gained momentum, with all 30,000 tickets (each costing €175 including camping) selling out more than seven weeks in advance. Presale tickets went on sale on Monday 28 November 2005. The event took place on the weekend of 1–3 September 2006, with the line-up being revealed on Friday 24 March. Artists who performed across the seven stages included Sparks, New Order, Pet Shop Boys, Basement Jaxx, Rufus Wainwright, Bloc Party, Yeah Yeah Yeahs, Gary Numan, François Kevorkian, Groove Armada, Damien Rice and The Frames. The Blue Nile's appearance was their only live performance of the year. The festival's biggest casualty was Gnarls Barkley who had to cancel their appearance after rapper/singer Cee-Lo strained his vocal cords. David McWilliams made an appearance as a celebrity. RTÉ Two televised the festival, with a special RTÉ Two Green Room being set up at Stradbally Hall Estate for presenters Tom Dunne and Jenny Huston.

Journalist and television presenter Joe O'Shea was arrested for driving in an intoxicated state on his way home from the event.

 Groove Armada
 New Order
 Basement Jaxx
 Yeah Yeah Yeahs
 The Frames
 Massive Attack
 Bloc Party
 Pet Shop Boys
 Josh Ritter
 Laurent Garnier
 Rufus Wainwright
 Elbow
 Paul Noonan
 Belle & Sebastian
 Jape
 Amadou & Mariam
 Minotaur Shock
 Tom Vek
 Aberfeldy
 The Archie Bronson Outfit
 The Swell Season
 Damien Rice
 Super Furry Animals
 Antony and the Johnsons
 DJ Shadow
 PJ Harvey
 Red Sirus
 Graham Coxon
 Mogwai
 Devendra Banhart
 Sparks
 Yo La Tengo
 David Kitt
 Mundy
 Broken Social Scene
 Messiah J & The Expert
 Dancepig
 Laura Izibor
 Tapes 'n Tapes
 dEUS
 The Skatalites
 Cora Venus Lunny
 Gary Numan
 The Rapture
 Hot Chip
 Tilly and the Wall
 Saul Williams
 Soulwax / 2 Many DJ's
 Tiefschwarz
 Dublin Gospel Choir
 François K
 Coldcut
 Spank Rock
 Modeselektor
 Digital Circus
 Tadhg Cooke
 Semifinalists
 Vyvienne Long
 Gang of Four
 Michael Franti
 David Geraghty
 Cut Chemist
 Hystereo
 Mad Professor
 Hexstatic
 Warlords of Pez
 Nouvelle Vague
 Zen Hussies
 The Rumours

The Comedy Tent in 2006 featured PJ Gallagher, Des Bishop, Neil Delamere, and Eric Lalor.

2007 festival

Electric Picnic 2007 was once again a three-day event and ran from 31 August until 2 September. The festival maintained its current size of 32,500 festival goers and kept all the same elements plus some new additions. "Early-bird" tickets for the 2007 festival went on sale between Monday 11 December 2006, and Saturday 24 February 2007, costing €199, taking into account the VAT that must now be paid on all outdoor events. Full price tickets went on sale on Tuesday 3 April at a price of €220. The first acts were officially announced on Monday 2 April.

Besides the music other attractions included an inflatable church offering mock weddings, luxury tents, massage chambers, a fairground and silent disco. Acii Disco DJs began the festival on the Friday at 12 p.m. in the Bodytonic Tent. Amongst others to take to the stage on Friday were Björk, Hot Chip, Scott Matthews, Manic Street Preachers and Oppenheimer whilst the unnamed band responsible for The Good, the Bad & the Queen headlined the Electric Arena tent. The Sunday night was brought to a close by Primal Scream.

The festival was marred by the death of a 23-year-old fan. The incident occurred as The Chemical Brothers came to a climax at 2 a.m. early on the Sunday morning. Organiser John Reynolds extended his sympathies and said: "A young man took ill at the festival, was treated at the medical centre, removed to Portlaoise Hospital and was later pronounced dead." Gardaí said they were not treating the death as suspicious.

 Beastie Boys
 Björk
 The Chemical Brothers
 Dublin Gospel Choir
 Sonic Youth
 LCD Soundsystem
 Primal Scream
 Jarvis Cocker
 M.I.A.
 Modest Mouse
 The Good, the Bad & the Queen
 Jamie Lidell
 Acii Disco DJs
 Easy Star All-Stars
 Ratatat
 Patrick Wolf
 The Flaws
 Mainlines
 Hexstatic
 Ukulele Orchestra of Great Britain
 Fujiya & Miyagi
 65daysofstatic
 Two Gallants
 Erasure
 Nouvelle Vague
 Duke Special
 Dave Couse
 Manic Street Preachers
 Soul II Soul
 The Jesus and Mary Chain
 Paul Hartnoll
 Shy Child
 !!!
 The Go! Team
 Aim
 Clap Your Hands Say Yeah
 Camera Obscura
 Fionn Regan
 Emporium
 Tobias Froberg
 PC Radio
 SiSi
 Ladytron
 Marlena Shaw
 Bonde Do Role
 Architecture in Helsinki
 The Stooges
 Spiritualized
 The Undertones
 Polyphonic Spree
 UNKLE
 The Magic Numbers
 Fluke
 Damien Dempsey
 Derrick Carter
 DJ Marky
 Sons and Daughters
 Greenskeepers
 Gaudi
 Jinx Lennon
 The Dead Milkmen
 Simian Mobile Disco (live)
 Josh Wink
 Deerhoof
 Hot Chip
 The Fall
 Lisa Hannigan
 The Rumours
 Brontosaurus Chorus
 Si Schroeder

2008 festival

Electric Picnic 2008 took place at Stradbally from 29 to 31 August, attended by 35,000 people. Presale tickets went on sale on 9 November 2007 and full price tickets went on sale on Friday 28 March at 9 p.m., costing €240 including camping, with the various sites opening at 9 a.m. on Friday 29 August. Tickets had sold out by 17 June.

Sigur Rós, George Clinton and Sex Pistols headlined. Other musicians appearing included Franz Ferdinand, My Bloody Valentine, German rockers Faust, Tindersticks, The Breeders, Grinderman, Goldfrapp, Gossip, CSS, Duffy, Foals, Hadouken!, Wilco, The Roots, Turin Brakes, Carbon/Silicon, Conor Oberst and New Young Pony Club. Irish acts to appear included Kíla, The Stunning, Sinéad O'Connor, Christy Moore, Liam Ó Maonlaí, Boss Volenti, The Waterboys, The Flaws, Ham Sandwich, Fred, Super Extra Bonus Party, Jape, Lisa Hannigan, Le Galaxie, Cathy Davey, Gemma Hayes and Mark Geary. Also attending were Amnesty International, which celebrated the 60th anniversary of the Universal Declaration of Human Rights with a singalong of "Happy Birthday" on the Sunday night.

2009 festival

Electric Picnic 2009 took place at Stradbally from 4–6 September. The British promoter Festival Republic bought out the share of Aiken Promotions as well as a further majority shareholding in Electric Picnic in March 2009. The festival was launched on 15 April 2009, with tickets going on sale two days later. The launch saw the announcement of forty-seven acts. Orbital, The Flaming Lips, Imelda May, Brian Wilson, Basement Jaxx, Madness, Klaxons, Bell X1, Fleet Foxes and MGMT were some of the musical acts which appeared, whilst Tommy Tiernan headlined in the comedy tent.

2010 festival

Early bird tickets for Electric Picnic 2010 went on sale on 4 December 2009.
The festival was launched on 24 March 2010, with Leftfield, Roxy Music, Public Image Ltd., LCD Soundsystem, Massive Attack, Modest Mouse, Mumford & Sons, Jón Þór Birgisson, Paul Brady, Imelda May and The Frames among the first acts to be confirmed.

2011 festival
Artists who played in 2011 included Arcade Fire, Pulp, The Chemical Brothers, Interpol, PJ Harvey, Beirut, Blonde Redhead, Zola Jesus, The Drums, Santigold, The Family Stone, Joan As Policewoman, Best Coast, 3epkano, Power of Dreams, Yuck, Foster The People, Alexandra Stan, The Undertones, Public Enemy, Jimmy Cliff, DJ Shadow, Flying Lotus, The Charlatans, Mogwai, Sinéad O'Connor, White Lies, OMD, Toots & the Maytals, Lykke Li, Midlake, The Rubberbandits, Death in Vegas, The Go! Team, Big Audio Dynamite, Boys Noize, Paul Kalkbrenner, Dave Clarke, Twin Shadow, Willy Mason, Trentemøller, Killing Joke, Health, Mundy, Gavin Friday, The Walkmen, Adam Beyer, Sharon Shannon, Ivan St. John, The Cast of Cheers, Micah P. Hinson, Caitlin Rose, The Potbelleez, Adebisi Shank, The Danger Is, Codes, And So I Watch You From Afar, and O Emperor.

The festival triumphed at the Irish Festival Awards, winning seven gongs, including Best Large Festival, Best Line up and Best Toilets.

2012 festival
Artists who performed at the 2012 festival included The Cure, The Killers, Elbow, Sigur Rós, Christy Moore, Orbital, Hot Chip, The xx, Wild Beasts, Of Monsters and Men, Patti Smith, The Roots, Crystal Castles, Grandaddy, SBTRKT, Mmoths, Metronomy, Bat for Lashes, The Maccabees, The Horrors, Richard Hawley, Azealia Banks, Ed Sheeran, The Jezabels, Michael Kiwanuka, Gavin Friday, Ryan Sheridan, Róisín O, Van Dyke Parks, Roots Manuva, Bell X1, Dublin Gospel Choir, Glen Hansard, Grizzly Bear, Willis Earl Beal, Alabama Shakes, Tindersticks, Fatoumata Diawara, Land Lovers, Eagle and the Worm, Solar Bears, Staff Benda Bilili, Little Roy, Lanterns on the Lake, Jonathan Wilson, Baxter Dury, Cranes, Milagres, In Tua Nua, Codes, Conor Linnie, Ocho and more to be announced.

2013 festival
The announcement of the 2013 festival was delayed significantly owing to a legal dispute regarding ownership of the festival between the festival's founder POD Concerts and its majority shareholder Festival Republic Dublin (FRD).

Despite fears that Electric Picnic would not return in 2013, Electric Picnic was subsequently scheduled to take place between 30 August and 1 September.

The initial line-up for the festival was announced on 25 April 2013 to much fanfare. The line-up included Björk, Fatboy Slim, Robert Plant, My Bloody Valentine, Arctic Monkeys, Franz Ferdinand, Wu-Tang Clan, David Byrne & St Vincent, Eels, Noah & The Whale, Johnny Marr, Disclosure, Ocean Colour Scene, Hurts, Mick Flannery, The Walkmen, Baauer, Tiga, Warpaint, Savages, The Strypes, Poliça, Chvrches, Parquet Courts, Clinic, Deap Vally and Soak.

2014 festival

Electric Picnic 2014 took place at Stradbally from 29 to 31 August, attended by 41,000 people. Early bird tickets went on sale on 19 March 2014. A Full weekend ticket cost €154.50 for purchasers who could prove they had been to three or more picnics, €174.50 for those who could prove they had been to the picnic once or twice previously. Tickets then increased to €194.50 until 4 July and, €229.50 after that date. Sunday tickets were priced at €90. Sunday tickets had sold out by 13 June. Full weekend tickets sold out on 31 July

Portishead, Outkast, Beck

Foals, Pet Shop Boys, Paolo Nutini
Chic Feat Nile Rodgers, Lily Allen, Blondie

Simple Minds. Sinead O'connor, Mogwai, James Vincent Mcmorrow
James Murphy, Sbtrkt, St. Vincent, Bombay Bicycle Club, London Grammar, The 1975
Slowdive, Wild Beasts, Metronomy, Kelis, Hozier, Laura Mvula, Duke Dumont

The Stranglers, Flume, The Blades, Neneh Cherry, Hercules & Love Affair, Annie Mac
Hamsandwich, The Strypes, Clean Bandit, Omar Souleyman, The Wailers
The Horrors, Le Galaxie Djs Present Laser Disco, Temples, Bp Fallon & The Ghost Wolves, Sohn
White Denim, Twin Shadow, Jungle, Fka Twigs, Bicep, Kaytranada, Sampha (Dj Set), Shit Robot
Krystal Klear, John Wizards, Walking On Cars, Nick Mulvey, Cathy Davey, Stephen Malkmus & The Jicks, Jenny Lewis, Asgeir, Wolf Alice
Drenge, The Orwells, Unknown Mortal Orchestra, The Districts, Glass Animals, Seinabo Sey, Vaults
Benjamin Booker, Vancouver Sleep Clinic, Rustie, Phox, Moko, Nightbox, Sheppard, The Whereabouts
We Cut Corners, The Minutes, Vann Music, All Tvvins, Booka Brass Band, Sleep Thieves, Spies, The Academic, Raglans, Orla Gartland, Buffalo Sunn, Daniel James, Acrobat, Matt Mcginn, Wyvern Lingo, Dublin Gospel Choir, Trinity Orchestra

Body & Soul Stage

Tune-Yards, Young Fathers, Perfume Genius, Kate Boy, Francois & The Atlas Mountains, Oum Shatt, Lau, Moodoid, Glass Animals, Olof Arnalds, Alice Boman, Dermot Byrne, Florian Blancke & Brendan O'regan, Join Me In The Pines, I Have A Tribe, Linkoban, Jon Gomm, Meltybrains? , Tommy Kd, C,R Avery, The Altered Hours, Buffalo Woman, Donal Dineen, Ronan O Snadaigh And The Occasionals, Sounds Of System Breakdown, Interskalactic, Viking Project, The Careers, Loah, Sleep Thieves, Grounds For Invasion, Youth Mass, Mongoose, Susan O' Neill & The Low Standards, Arioso, Grouse,

Upstage

Kowton, Shanti Celeste, Replete, O,Utlier, Chris Farrell, Tr-One (Live), Talkboy, Unknwn (Live), Ghosts, Ryan Vail, Shane Mannion, Lake People (Live), Donal Dineen, Reid, Adultrock (Live), Discotekken, Gilbert Steele, Contour, Sol & Louche, Richem, P Disconaut, Djkidcam, Mikey Joyride Soro,

Earthship

Maud In Cahoots, Ruff Chuff Live Crew, Come On Live Long, Leo Moran & Anto Thistletwaite, The Tav Jam Band, Wob! , Joe Fury & The Hayride, Punch Face Champions, Willow Sea & Guests, Aindrias De Staic And The Latchikos, Attention Bebe, Stevie G & The Deep South Soul Soundsystem, The Eskies, Simi Crowns, Noelie Mcdonnell & Band, Edft, I Am Niamh, Polyphonic X, The Amazing Few, Sinead White, The Ground Will Shake, Koukie, Floor Staff, Somerville, Eileen Keane, Malcolm London, Symphonic Funk, Tradiohead, Mikey And The Scallywags, Strange Boats, G,I,R,O, The Cold Draw, Louisiana 6, Shay Cotter And The New Blues, Analogue Wave, In The Willows,

Comedy

Simon Amstell, David O'doherty, Seann Walsh, Jason Byrne, Rubberbandits, Abandoman, David Mcsavage, John Colleary, Patrick Mcdonnell, Steve Frost Improv Allstars, Aisling Bea, Bec Hill, Gunther Grun, Foil Arms And Hog, Eleanor Tiernan, Chris Kent, Jarlath Regan, Colm O'regan, Karl Spain, Colum Mcdonnell, Fred Cooke, Eric Lalor, Al Porter, Kevin Mcgarhen, Tomie James, Trevor Browne, Steve Bennett, Danny Dowling,

The Mobile Home Stage|Trailer Park

The Young Folk, The Whereabouts
Get Back: The Story Of The Beatles, Pearl Tn, Hustle, Storyfold, Kevin Doyle's Elvis: The Way It Was, C,R, Avery, Harvest: A Tribute To Neil Young, The Trampz, Ghost Estates, Clive Barnes, Kingston, Viking Project, This Side Up, Tucan, Cult Called Man, Kevin Sheridan, Moo! , Throwing Halos, Risky Business, Prison Love, Cuan And Lukas (Dj), John & Mandy, White Chalk, My Fellow Sponges, Eric Butler And The Revelators,

Jimmie Lee's Juke Joint|Trailer Park

Eric Butler And The Revelators, Dave Clarke Byrd Band, Reverend Jm's Panic Workshop, Sal Vitro, Dark Lanes, Keywest, Red Empire, Richard Farrell & The Last Tribe, Huey & The Hobgoblins, Prairie Dawgs, Crow Black Chicken, Whistle, Oki's Wagon

Salty Dog

Cathy Davey, The Districts, Pearl Tn, Terry Hooley, The Minutes, Alien Envoy, Booka Brass Band, King Kong Company, Bronagh Gallagher, Deke Diggler, Pilgrim Street, Pete Pamf Sextette, Phil Cosby, Corner Boy, Cult Called Man, Deep Down Detox, Prison Love, The Square Pegs, New Secret Weapon, This Side Up, Sean's Walk, Camembert Quartet, Andy Allday, Stephen James, Nick Thornley's 50s Vinyl, Salty Dog Allstars Parallel Lines, Marie-Therese, Julian Lloyd's Love Breakfast, Raglans, Nick Sergent, Aidan Kavanagh's Caribbean Calypso King, Skazz

Trenchtown, Main Stage Inna Live Yard

Solo Banton, Capitol 1212 A M,A,D, Jah Lex, Mr. Williamz, Dirty Dubsters, Cian Finn, Ri Ra, Dublin Afrobeat Ensemble, Arubdub, After The Ibis, Bles, Skazz, Belfast Reggae, Crazy D, Synergy, Interskalactic, Timothy Starr, Ras Tinny & Baby Ewe, Joyful Noiz, Tt Dub, The Bionic Rats, Johnny Dread, Glenn Brown, The Dodgy Few, Junior Spesh, Oi Oi Soundsystem, Tom Beary, Lionheart, Dj Kali,

Trenchtown, Roots Inna Da Woods Arena

Revelation Sound System, Mialodica, Benji Revelation, I Kingdom Soundsystem, World Bass Culture, Fyahred, Dan Taliras, Worries Outernational, Proff Ruff Chuff, Explosion Soundsystem,

Trenchtown, Treasure Beach Stage
Will Softly, Dave Barry, Slick Normal, Nigel Woods,

Red Bull Music Academy

Boddika, Joy Orbison, Dark Sky, Sunil Sharpe, Dorian Concept, Rift, Clu, Republik Djs, Kobina, Handsome Paddy, Colm K

Casa Bacardi

Dimitri From Paris, Greg Wilson, The 2 Bears, Nancy Whang, Ejeca, Pleasurekraft, Jonas Rathsman, Billy Scurry, Ghostboy, Mother Djs, Disconauts, Get Down Edits, Decent Perks, Discotekken, Kelly-Anne Byrne,

Jerry Fish Electric Sideshow

Propellor Palms, Duke Special's Gramaphone Club, Felix Sonnyboy, Gangs, The Minutes, Jerry Fish, Together Disco, Guilty Boy Association, Sally Cinnamon, Camille O'sullivan, Richard Egan, The Frank & Walters, The Lost Brothers, R,S,A,G, Interskalactic, All The Luck In The World, I'm Your Vinyl, The Kilo 1977, Shir Madness, Foxy P Cox, The Pony Girls, Crow Black Chicken, John Blek And The Rats, Brian Deady, Chanelle Mc Guinness

2015 festival

Electric Picnic 2015 took place at Stradbally from 4–6 September. The first acts were announced in March 2015.
There was speculation that the capacity would be raised from the present 42,000 to 47,000 to cater for increased demand. The headliners were Sam Smith, Blur, and Florence and the Machine.

2016 festival
Electric Picnic 2016 took place on 2–4 September. It was headlined by LCD Soundsystem, Lana Del Rey, The Chemical Brothers, New Order and Noel Gallagher's High Flying Birds.

Line ups

Main Stage

Friday: Ryan Sheridan, ABC, Nas, The 1975, The Chemical Brothers

Saturday: Trinity Orchestra, Hermitage Green, The Lightning Seeds, Gavin James, Catfish and the Bottlemen, Bell X1, Noel Gallagher's High Flying Birds, LCD Soundsystem

Sunday: Dublin Gospel Choir, Toots and the Maytals, Local Natives, James Bay, Nathaniel Rateliff & the Night Sweats, New Order, Lana Del Rey

2017 festival
Electric Picnic 2017 took place on 1–3 September. It was headlined by Duran Duran, A Tribe Called Quest and The xx.

Line ups

Main Stage

Friday: Little Hours, Hudson Taylor, The Divine Comedy, London Grammar, The xx

Saturday: Keywest, The Strypes, Giggs, Madness, Run the Jewels, Phoenix, A Tribe Called Quest, Pete Tong

Sunday: Dublin Gospel Choir, The Skatalites, Rag'n'Bone Man, The Pretenders, Chaka Khan, Elbow, Duran Duran

2018 festival

Electric Picnic 2018 took place at Stradbally from 31 August to the 2 September.
Tickets for the festival sold-out in less than 24 hours after the lineup was announced in March 2018.	

MAIN STAGE
Friday
10.40pm-midnight – Kendrick Lamar
9-10pm – Walking on Cars
7.30-8.30pm – Chvrches
6-7pm – Ash
5-5.30pm – Brand New Friend

Saturday
12.15-1.30am – Massive Attack
10.30-11.30pm – NERD
8.45-9.45pm – Dua Lipa
7-8pm – Gavin James
5.15-6.15pm – Mavis Staples
3.30-4.30pm – Gomez
1.45-2.45pm– Hudson Taylor

Sunday
10.30pm-midnight – The Prodigy
8.45-9.45pm – Picture This
7-8pm – George Ezra
5.30-6.30pm – Nile Rodgers & Chic
4.15-5pm – Garbage
2.30-3.30pm – Inner Circle
1-2pm – Dublin Gospel Choir

2019 festival

Electric Picnic 2019 took place at Stradbally from 30 August to the 1 September.	
		
Friday
10.30pm Hozier
9pm Dermot Kennedy
7.30pm Billie Eilish
6.00pm Christine and the Queens

Saturday
11.30pm The 1975
9.15pm Royal Blood
7.45pm Kodaline
6pm Gerry Cinnamon
4.30pm Years & Years
3.15pm Wild Youth
1.45pm The Riptide Movement
6pm David Kennan

Sunday
10.30pm Florence and the Machine
8.30pm Tame Impala
7pm Richard Ashcroft
5.30pm Jess Glynne
4.15pm Razorlight
2.30pm Soja
1pm Dublin Gospel Choir

2020 festival
The 2020 event was cancelled due to the COVID-19 pandemic.

2021 festival
The 2021 event was cancelled due to the COVID-19 pandemic.

2022 festival

Electric Picnic 2022 took place at Stradbally from 2 to 4 September after a gap of two years. Dermot Kennedy, Tame Impala and the Arctic Monkeys headlined the festival.

The HSE issued a drug warning to festivalgoers after "high strength" MDMA with two times the average dose was found. An anonymous drug testing facility was set up at the festival for the first time.

See also

List of electronic music festivals
Longitude Festival
Oxegen

References

External links
 
 Review of the 2005 Electric Picnic Festival
 Review of the 2005 Electric Picnic Festival
 Review of the 2006 Electric Picnic Festival
 The Ticket at Electric Picnic 2007
 Electric Picnic 2008 Playlist
 Electric Picnic V Oxegen 2009, FIGHT!

 
Music festivals established in 2004
2000s in Irish music
2010s in Irish music
Annual events in Ireland
Music in County Laois
Rock festivals in Ireland
Stradbally
Culture in County Laois
Tourism in County Laois
Electronic music festivals in Ireland